The following are international rankings of Armenia

Demographics

United Nations: Population, ranked 136 out of 242 countries
CIA World Factbook: Urbanization ranked 80 out of 194 countries

Economy

World Economic Forum's Global Competitiveness Report 2011-2012, ranked 92 out of 142 countries. 
World Bank: Ease of Doing Business Index 2011, ranked 48 out of 183 countries 
International Monetary Fund: GDP per capita 2011, ranked 116 out of 182 countries 
 The Wall Street Journal and Heritage Foundation: Index of Economic Freedom 2012, ranked 39 out of 179 countries
CIA World Factbook: GDP per capita 2011, ranked 117 out of 192 countries  
International Monetary Fund: GDP per capita 2011, ranked 122 out of 185
World Bank: GDP per capita 2011, ranked 120 out of 190

Education

Geography

Total area ranked 141 out of 233 countries and outlying territories 
Renewable water resources as of 1997, ranked 136 out of 174 countries

Military

Military expenditures ranked 84 out of 171 countries 
CIA World Factbook: Military expenditures ratio to GDP, ranked 49 out of 172 countries 
Institute for Economics and Peace  2012 Global Peace Index ranked  115 out of 158

Politics

Transparency International: 2012 Corruption Perceptions Index, ranked 105 out of 174 countries
Reporters Without Borders: 2011-2012 Press Freedom Index, ranked 77 out of 179 countries
The Economist EIU: Democracy Index 2011, ranked 111 out of 167 countries

Tourism
World Economic Forum's Travel and Tourism Competitiveness Report 2011, ranked 90 out of 139 countries.

Transportation

Motor vehicles per capita in 2007, ranked 93 out of 144 countries

References

Armenia